The St. Mary's Rectory in Cumberland, Wisconsin, also referred to as its address, 1575 Second Avenue, is a former Roman Catholic rectory. It was built in 1904 and attached to the parish of St. Mary's of the Wayside, which merged with St. Anthony Abbot in 1973.

The rectory was added to the National Register of Historic Places in 2011. Additionally, it is listed on the Wisconsin State Register of Historic Places.

History
The rectory was built for the Reverend Dr. Stephen Leinfelder, who was the youngest American to hold degrees in both philosophy and theology. It remained church property until it was sold in 1985, at which time it became a boarding house. The building was sold again in 1991 and was converted into a bed and breakfast by the new owners, named The Rectory. The owners later closed the bed and breakfast, and the building is now their private residence.

References

Properties of religious function on the National Register of Historic Places in Wisconsin
Clergy houses in the United States
Bed and breakfasts in Wisconsin
Houses completed in 1904
National Register of Historic Places in Barron County, Wisconsin